The Minnie A. Caine was a four-masted wooden schooner built by Seattle shipbuilding the Moran Brothers in 1900. One of the schooner's initial short-term co-owners, Elmer Caine, named her after his wife, Minnie. From 1900 to 1926, the schooner was operated out of San Francisco by Charles Nelson Co., one of the largest transporters of lumber in the United States at the time. The schooner transported lumber across the Pacific Ocean from the Pacific Northwest to ports in Australia and Americas, but after 1920, her scope of operations became limited to the West Coast lumber trade. By 1926, the company could no longer run a sailing ship profitably, and the Minnie A. Caine was moored in a marine boneyard in California.

In 1931, the schooner was purchased by Olaf C. Olsen and turned into an unrigged fishing barge operating off the Santa Monica Pier. After a severe storm in September 1939, the Minnie A. Caine was grounded in Santa Monica Bay. Three months later, her wreckage became a threat to a California highway and had to be incinerated.

The schooner became widely known for a series of incidents immortalized by her portrayal in literature. Twice, the Minnie A. Caine suffered damage that amounted to 50% of her cost, but was successfully salvaged. The salvage operation after her grounding in 1901 lasted three months and was featured in Scientific American. The fire that almost destroyed the schooner in 1917 in Adelaide inspired fiction from Peter Kyne, Joan Lowell, and Corey Ford.

The Cradle of the Deep, an autobiography written by silent movie actress Joan Lowell in March 1929, topped the non-fiction category of The New York Times Best Seller list. The autobiography purported that Lowell had spent her childhood on the Minnie A. Caine, and provided details about many unusual and frightening experiences. It was soon discovered that the autobiography was a hoax, resulting in a nationwide literary scandal. Later that year, Corey Ford published Salt Water Taffy, a parody of The Cradle of the Deep that in turn, also became a bestseller.

Construction 

Construction of the Minnie A. Caine began in Seattle in December 1899. At the time, Seattle was benefiting from the early years of the Nome Gold Rush, which propelled the small town to its later prosperity. One of the beneficiaries of the rush was Seattle citizen and a future millionaire Elmer Caine, who made his starting capital by transporting eager new colonists from Seattle to Nome and other Alaskan ports, rising from the captain and ticket agent of a small steamer to a prominent shipowner.

In 1899, aiming to diversify shipping interests and maximize profits, Caine ordered several vessels built simultaneously, with the intent to finance them in partnership with other shipowners. Unlike the other ships, which were built to service coastal Alaskan routes, the Minnie A. Caine was designed for the long-distance lumber trade. Caine named the vessel after his wife, Minnie, although he owned only approximately ⅓ of the ship. Half belonged to the Charles Nelson Co., a San Francisco shipping company that specialized in lumber trade, and the remaining one-sixth was owned by local associates of Caine from Seattle.

The Minnie A. Caine was the first sailing ship constructed by the Seattle shipbuilding company Moran Brothers, which generally specialized in steam-powered vessels. The vessel's price was $55,000 ($1,500,000 in 2020 dollars). One worker died during the ship's construction when the scaffolding collapsed in May 1900. The construction was supervised by George Monk, Ed Monk's father. On October 6, 1900, at 2:30 pm, in front of 3,000 spectators, the Minnie A. Caine was launched broadside, creating a spectacular splash. The same day, the vessel was christened by Nellie Moran, Robert Moran's daughter.

Specifications 
The Minnie A. Caine was a wooden, single-deck, four-masted schooner with two tiers of beams. All four masts were equipped with topmasts; the foremast was outfitted with a single yard and a square sail.

Up to 30% of the load could be placed on a deck that was constructed with a minimum of fixtures and equipment. She was equipped with bow and stern ports to facilitate lumber loading and unloading operations.

History of voyages

Lumber trade, 1900–1919 

After her launch, the Minnie A. Caine was utilized in the trans-Pacific lumber trade. She typically carried a full load of lumber from Washington state or British Columbia to ports in Australia, Hawaii, Mexico, Chile, or Peru. Until the late 1910s, the economics of the trans-Pacific lumber trade depended on payment opportunities for return cargoes. Return cargo loads typically included a load of coal from Newcastle, Australia to Honolulu where coal was in demand for the local sugar industry, followed by a load of sugar for San Francisco. Alternatively, a load of coal could be taken from Australia all the way to the Pacific Northwest; for example, in 1907 the Minnie A. Caine brought coal to Nanaimo, British Columbia and loaded her next cargo of lumber at the same port.

The Minnie A. Caine's most typical cyclic voyage was the Seattle–Sydney–Newcastle–Honolulu–San Francisco–Seattle route. On average, this route took her nine months. A one-way trip to Australia lasted approximately three months, and the loading and unloading processes were complicated, so docking could take weeks, after which the schooner often waited for return-trip cargo. This route was also the Minnie A. Caine's maiden voyage. She was scheduled to leave Puget Sound for Sydney on October 25, 1900. From the day of launch, the Minnie A. Caine's captain was J. K. Olsen.

Although initially the Minnie A. Caine operated under multiple owners, by 1903, Charles Nelson Co. has consolidated the ownership of the schooner and re-registered her to the port of San Francisco. The company operated multiple vessels and was growing to become one of the largest lumber transporters in the United States.

The grounding of 1901 

The Minnie A. Caine's maiden voyage did not return to Seattle until December 23, 1901, having been delayed in San Francisco port by the "strike trouble" there. Her next assignment was to pick up a load of lumber from Chemainus, a logging town in British Columbia, and deliver it to Callao, the main port of Peru.

The schooner left Port Townsend, Washington on December 24, 1901. As she should pass through Haro Strait and the narrow passages around Salt Spring Island, she was pulled by a small -ton tug, Magic. On Christmas Eve, as the coupled ships were passing Victoria, British Columbia in the northeastern part of Strait of Juan de Fuca, it encountered a severe storm that covered the entire area and was described as "the worst storm seen in many years."

The roll of the larger vessel—the Minnie A. Caine—soon reached critical amplitude, and at 2:00 a.m., the hawser had to be severed to save the Magic from overturning. The steam-powered Magic managed to reach Port Townsend safely, pouring machine oil around herself to "keep the seas down." The crew of the Minnie A. Caine "heroically" attempted to sail through the storm, but the gale gradually ripped all her sails, and the schooner ended up thrown ashore on a rocky beach on northwestern Smith Island.

The crew was safe and found refuge inside the Smith Island lighthouse. Subsequent inspection of the schooner revealed damage to her bottom, and she was generally believed to be a complete loss. At the time, the estimated cost of salvage and repair—from $60,000 to $65,000 (from $1,600,000 to $1,700,000 in 2020 dollars)—was higher than her original price.

Salvage operation of 1902 

It turned out that only Elmer Caine's share of the schooner was covered by insurance (in the amount of $17,500 ($465,000 in 2020 dollars)). The largest share, owned by Charles Nelson, was uninsured, and he sent his nephew, James Tyson, to investigate the possibility of salvage to the avoid $35,000 ($930,000) loss. The damage to the ship was not as severe as originally feared, but re-launching the vessel was problematic. Charles Nelson Company and Caine's insurance underwriters joined forces to organize the salvage, but all offered bids were too high.

Finally, the parties agreed that Robert Moran of Moran Brothers would attempt the salvage. The operation was led by Moran employee Captain Klitgaard. The salvage became "widely followed" and its details were featured in the Scientific American. The operation was complicated by the remote location of the wreck site, as all supplies, including fresh water, had to be delivered from Port Townsend. Caine allocated another of his ships, the tug Wallowa, to assist with transportation. The tug transported supplies to host and feed the 40 people involved in the operation, and brought back surviving fittings, including the removed topmasts,) from Smith Island.

The actual salvage started in February 1902. The 40 workers used heavy timber to construct skids to direct the schooner into the water. They employed hydraulic jackscrews to dislodge her from the sand onto the skids while the Wallowa pulled the Minnie A. Caine towards the water. The schooner was moved 45 feet, but a March storm destroyed weeks of work, pushing the schooner back to its original location. The procedure had to be restarted in April. The Wallowa attempted to pull the vessel 85 feet towards the water, but her power was insufficient. On May 4, a more powerful tug, the Tyee, from the Puget Sound Tug Boat Co., was chartered, but it took the simultaneous application of two tugs—the Tyee and the Tacoma—on May 9 to return Minnie A. Caine to the water.

The schooner was tugged to the Moran Brothers' dock in Seattle, where she underwent repairs until starting a voyage to San Francisco in September 1902. The salvage operation ended up costing almost $20,000 ($530,000), with subsequent repairs at Moran's costing an additional $10,000 ($270,000), which amounted to almost half the vessel's value. Because Elmer Caine used his own tug and men during the salvage operation, he ended up owning a 50% share of the vessel. However, by 1903, he sold his share to Charles Nelson Co. which became the Minnie A. Caine's sole owner.

1906–1909 incidents
During one of the voyages from Washington state to San Francisco in November 1906, the Minnie A. Caine saved the crew of another San Franciscan schooner, the Emma Caudina, which was wrecked off Grays Harbor. Three years later, on December 27, 1909, the Minnie A. Caine itself reached Grays Harbor in miserable condition after encountering a typhoon. The schooner was sailing from Haiphong, French Indochina, to Bellingham, Washington, and the typhoon carried away all her sails and destroyed most of her provisions. The crew was suffering from severe hunger. Captain J.K. Olsen became stricken with heart disease, and on arrival was taken to the Hoquiam hospital in critical condition. G. Nelson became the Minnie A. Caine's new captain.

Australian incidents of 1917–1918 

For the 1917 voyage to Australia, Captain G. Nelson was replaced by Captain Nicholas Wagner. Unloading was scheduled to finish at the Corporation Wharf by September 4; however, at 6:30 p.m. on September 3, a fire erupted in the schooner's lower hold. The captain's wife and their three children made a hasty escape to a nearby hotel while the port's fire brigade, reinforcements from the city, the captain, and a few crew members fought the fire. The gasoline was safely jettisoned, but the fire was not contained until 10 p.m., when the firefighters were assisted by a heavy rain. The schooner was eventually half-sunk from the amount of water poured in to fight the fire, her masts resting on the surface of the wharf.

The fire "almost completely destroyed the ship." The rapid progress of the fire from a section used to store sails raised suspicions of an arson. A special inquiry into the cause of the fire was held on September 20, but "it was not considered desirable to disclose" its findings to the public.

The schooner was moved to a dry dock of A. McFarlane & Sons in Birkenhead to assess the damage. The sternpost, poop deck, and a number of knees in the aft section needed to be replaced completely. The knee replacement was of particular concern, as at the time, there was no sufficiently large timber available in Australia, raising doubts if that schooner could be repaired in Adelaide.

Despite all the difficulties, A. McFarlane & Sons repaired the schooner "satisfactorily" by January 1918, although test runs and repairs of residual leakage continued until March. The overall cost of the repairs was 5,500 Australian pounds ($25,795 in 1917 US dollars or $574,267 in 2020 dollars). The Minnie A. Caine was unable to leave Adelaide in March, however, because she became the first ship arrested in the port in years on the charge of not settling ship survey account amounting to 42 Australian pounds. The case went to Australian Admiralty Court, which eventually cleared the schooner and captain of the charge. Minnie A. Caine's ordeal in Adelaide finally ended on June 19, 1918, when the schooner sailed to San Francisco. By that time, one of the captain's sons was old enough to marry a local girl from Semaphore neighborhood of Adelaide.

1920–1926 lumber trade
After World War I, the economics of the trans-Pacific lumber trade changed. Advances in shipbuilding gave the advantage to steam-powered vessels, gradually rendering the concept of a sailing lumber schooner archaic. The building of sailing ships effectively ceased after 1905, and moreover, the end of World War I flooded the market with a fleet of steamers no longer needed for hostilities. On the other hand, the Hawaiian sugar industry had switched from coal to oil, and it was less and less profitable to carry coal as a return cargo from Australia.

By 1921, Charles Nelson Co. was one of the largest lumber trading companies in United States. Unlike most of its competitors, it hadn't gotten rid of its sailing vessels prior to World War I. In the changed economy, the company transferred its lumber schooners from the trans-Pacific lumber trade to the West Coast lumber trade, delivering lumber from the Pacific Northwest to San Francisco. Moreover, the schooners no longer sailed this route; instead, they were tugged along the coast by a steam schooner also loaded with lumber, or by a tug. This approach permitted the operation of schooners with a minimal crew of less-experienced sailors, saving money on wages and keeping the transport rates down.

By 1919, Captain J. K. Olsen returned to command of the Minnie A. Caine, and the schooner began a cycle of tug-assisted voyages, mainly from Port Angeles or Mukilteo in Washington State to San Francisco, and occasionally as far as Mexico. By 1923, the Minnie A. Caine was the last sailing vessel operated by that Charles Nelson Co. By 1926, even this method of lumber transport became unprofitable. Her last voyage was from Port Angeles; the schooner arrived in San Francisco on August 8, 1926, and was later towed to the marine boneyard in Alameda, California.

Fishing barge 
By 1931, strained by the Great Depression, the Charles Nelson Co. was actively selling unneeded vessels. Simultaneously, Captain Olaf C. Olsen, a "square-jawed Norwegian" and one of many Pacific Coast sailors formerly involved in the West Coast lumber trade, discovered a business opportunity in operating a fishing barge. Since 1925, he had successfully operated the barque Narwhal in this capacity, and formed the Malibu Maritime Corporation. After selling the Narwhal to a film studio, in April 1931 Olsen purchased the Minnie A. Caine to turn it into a fishing barge operating off the Santa Monica Pier.

The schooner was tugged along the California coast from the boneyard in Alameda to San Pedro, where her masts were cut off. She was subsequently reclassified as a barge with a crew of two, and registered to the Malibu Maritime Corporation with her home port listed as Los Angeles. In May 1931, the Minnie A. Caine was anchored for the summer in Santa Monica Bay, not far from the Santa Monica Pier.

For the next eight years, the Minnie A. Caine spent summers anchored in the bay, and Captain Olaf C. Olsen operated a small boat to bring fishermen to his barge. The ticket was 50 cents; during the Depression years, a kid could fish on the Minnie A. Caine for a full day and bring home enough fish to sell it for spending money for a couple of weeks and the next ticket. At night, it was rumored that "merry" parties were held on the vessel, where alcohol was served. A piano was delivered to Minnie A. Caine for entertainment. During the winter months, the former schooner was moored off the docks in San Pedro.

The grounding of 1939 

During the night of September 24, 1939, after an unprecedentedly hot summer, Santa Monica Bay was hit by a severe storm, with gales reaching . At the time, Captain Olsen, five crew members, and an unidentified number of guests were on board. Anchored in the bay, the Minnie A. Caine rode out the storm six miles off the Santa Monica Pier.

All guests and the six crew members were safe. The guests were transported ashore by small boats before the worst of the storm hit, but the crew members had to be rescued later that night by the Coast Guard. The next day, after a futile attempt to free the vessel with tugs, the crew discovered serious damage to her keel. The Minnie A. Caine was written off as total loss and eventually abandoned. During the next several weeks, the grounded vessel was served as amusement for the local residents, who drove north of downtown of Santa Monica to observe the wreckage.

The fallout of the grounding 

Three months after her wreck, the Minnie A. Caine created new problems for the city of Santa Monica and the California Highway Commission. A sandbank had quickly formed, connecting the grounded vessel to the shore and disturbing the intricate flow of currents inside the Santa Monica Bay. As a result, ocean waves started battering and cutting into a  section of California State Route 1. By December 1939,  of berm had washed off, causing erosion of the roadway.

As an emergency measure, 500 tons of riprap were dumped along the highway and one last attempt was made to free the vessel. After the attempt proved unsuccessful, a call was put out through the newspapers to salvage the wreckage for timber. When this produced few results, the decision was made to burn the wreckage, and Captain Olsen signed abandonment papers. While the engineers prepared the burn, an additional 500 tons of riprap were dumped along the damaged portion of the highway.

After pouring  of fuel oil and gasoline over the Minnie A. Caine, highway engineers set her on fire at 1 a.m. on December 22, 1939. Many Santa Monica residents gathered to observe the fire. The fire continued through the next day, and it soon became apparent that additional fuel was needed to ensure that the ship's  water-soaked hull would burn. On December 23,  of crude oil were added to the fire, followed by another  of oil later in the day. By December 24, the fire was out, but a portion of the vessel remained stuck the sand.

The engineers feared that the remaining portion of the ship would continue disrupting the currents, and suggested using explosives to finish the destruction. This measure, however, was protested by concerned local residents, who feared that an explosion might trigger landslides and damage their properties. Over the next month, the tide dispersed the remaining wreckage and the threat to the highway was eliminated.

In popular culture

The Cradle of the Deep 

In March 1929, when the Minnie A. Caine was moored in the California boneyard, Simon & Schuster published an autobiography of Joan Lowell, a silent movie actress whose largest accomplishment was a small role in Charlie Chaplin's The Gold Rush. Titled The Cradle of the Deep, the autobiography portrayed the first 17 years of Lowell's life as being spent on the Minnie A. Caine. According to the book, Lowell was the captain's daughter, who was taken onto the schooner when she was just eleven months old and spent her next 17 years barefoot on the ship in the company of her father and the all-male crew.

Peppered with "salty cuss words" and "mildly sexy" scenes, the book was considered controversial, at the time which added to its popularity. The biography purports that the Minnie A. Caine belonged to Lowell's father, and made most of her voyages in the South Pacific. The story is a mix of strange episodes and frightening experiences, including a dance of virgins on Atafu, Lowell playing strip poker with the crew, Lowell's father dissipating a waterspout with rifle shots, a near-death experience when Lowell and all the crew were stricken with scurvy, and finally, the ship's conflagration and sinking in Australia, followed by Lowell's  swim to the safety of a lighthouse.

The book received multiple positive reviews from different sources, including The Washington Post, Time, Life, Los Angeles Times, etc. Moreover, in an era when book clubs functioned as the most important distribution channel for books, in March 1929, The Cradle of the Deep was voted the Book of the Month by the jury of the highly influential Book of the Month Club. The book became a bestseller, topping the non-fiction category of The New York Times Best Seller list.

The Cradle of the Deep was subsequently exposed as a hoax when Lowell's school records from Berkeley, California were produced, proving that she hadn't spent her life at sea, and the Minnie A. Caine itself was found unscathed in the Alameda boneyard. Joan Lowell's real name was Helen Joan Wagner, and at the age of 15, together with her mother and two brothers, she did indeed accompany her father, Nicholas Wagner, on his one-year assignment as the captain of the Minnie A. Caine on the schooner's unlucky voyage to Australia in 1917–1918.

The exposure led to a literary scandal of "an astonishing magnitude" that echoed across all United States. It was further exacerbated by the fact that the hoax was motivated by profit-seeking, and that neither Lowell nor the publishers ever admitted the forgery. The Book of the Month Club offered refunds to its subscribers, and The Cradle of the Deep soon ended up on bookstore shelves of discounted books.

Salt Water Taffy 
Three months after the exposure of The Cradle of the Deep as a hoax, American humorist Corey Ford published a parody of Lowell's fake autobiography. Titled Salt Water Taffy; or, Twenty thousand leagues away from the sea; the almost incredible autobiography of Capt. Ezra Triplett's seafaring daughter, by June Triplett, the parody was published under the pseudonym "June Triplett" and dedicated to Corey Ford. The book is a "witty, well-written inversion of The Cradle of the Deep", as Ford effectively used the tools of parody — inversion and amplification — to expose the absurdity of Lowell's book.

In Salt Water Taffy, Lowell is cast as a "vain and naïve heroine." The ship's name is also purposely distorted throughout the book; different characters refer to it as the Carrie L. Maine, the Minnie J. Cohan, the Minnie I. Cohen, etc. The parody was a great success, as Salt Water Taffy itself became a bestseller, eventually surpassing the sales of The Cradle of the Deep.

Cappy Ricks and Popeye 
The eventful life of the Minnie A. Caine, including the fire in Adelaide on September 3, 1917, was an inspiration for some of Peter Kyne's Cappy Ricks stories and the subsequent silent movie of the same name shot in 1921 by Paramount Pictures.

A number of authors have claimed that Captain Olaf C. Olsen, while he was operating the Narwhal and the Minnie A. Caine as fishing barges near the Santa Monica Pier, was the inspiration and prototype for the cartoon character Popeye created by American cartoonist E. C. Segar. However, an alternative theory states that Popeye was inspired by Rocky Fiegel from Chester, Illinois.

Aftermath 
Elmer Caine, who ordered and built the Minnie A. Caine, died early and unexpectedly in 1908, leaving his wife, Minnie, with an estate of over $1 million ($27,000,000 in 2020 dollars). She survived her husband by 14 years, dying in San Francisco in 1922 while the Minnie A. Caine was still carrying lumber throughout the Pacific. She didn't live to see her name twisted in the Corey Ford's parody.

Moran Brothers built only one more sailing ship: the barkentine James Johnson. The company failed during World War I, and in 1916 was purchased by Todd Shipyards Corporation. The Charles Nelson Co. over-expanded and failed during the Depression. On the other hand, A. McFarlane & Sons, which repaired the Minnie A. Caine after the fire in Adelaide, still existed as of 2013, the fourth generation of McFarlanes still building and repairing sailing yachts. Captain Olaf C. Olsen died in Santa Monica in 1950 at the age of 70.

While the Minnie A. Caine was moored in the boneyard, it was occasionally scrapped for parts. Her only life boat ended up on the four-masted steel barque Moshulu, which was also briefly owned by the Charles Nelson Co. As late as 1947, the lifeboat, displaying the name of its original ship, was still seen on the barque. The cabin clock from the Minnie A. Caine ended up installed on the three-masted schooner , and was still intact in 1958 when the schooner made its last voyage and was preserved at the San Francisco Maritime National Historical Park.

Joan Lowell suffered social and financial disappointment when the authenticity of her autobiography was debunked. She attempted other literary endeavors unsuccessfully, and ended up leaving for Brazil, where she died in 1967. As of 2012, The Cradle of the Deep is still remembered as one of "the greatest hoaxes of all times" and Joan Lowell as a "grandmother of literary hoaxes." Nevertheless, her fraudulent autobiography is said to have immortalized the Minnie A. Caine.

See also 
 Moran Brothers
 Joan Lowell

Notes

References

Literature cited

External links 

 Salt Water People Historical Society Page
 Museum of Hoaxes Page
 South Australian Maritime Museum Page

Individual sailing vessels
1900 ships
Tall ships of the United States
Schooners of the United States
Lumber schooners
Four-masted ships
Ships built in Seattle